Levash may refer to several localities in Russia:
A rural locality in Babushkinsky District, Vologda Oblast
Levash, Totemsky District, Vologda Oblast
Levash, Nyuksensky District, Vologda Oblast